Curetis saronis, the Burmese sunbeam or Saronis sunbeam, is a species of butterfly belong to the lycaenid family. It is found in Asia.

Distribution
Eastern India. Assam. Sylhet to Myanmar, Thailand, Indochina. Sumatra, Singapore. Pulau Rumbia.

Cited references

See also
Lycaenidae
List of butterflies of India (Lycaenidae)

References
  
 
 
 
 

saronis
Butterflies of Singapore
Butterflies described in 1877
Taxa named by Frederic Moore
Butterflies of Asia